South Central Florida Express, Inc.  (originally known as the South Central Florida Railroad ) is a common carrier shortline railroad in southern Florida run by U.S. Sugar Corporation. Its trains operate from Sebring to Fort Pierce via Clewiston around the southern perimeter of Lake Okeechobee, and serves customers at 26 locations. With  of track, the SCXF is the largest private agricultural railroad in the U.S.

The railroad began operation in 1994 on tracks previously owned and operated by CSX Transportation; in 1998, operation expanded on to tracks leased from the Florida East Coast Railway (FEC). In addition to the SCXF, U.S. Sugar has its own private tracks known as the U.S. Sugar Railroad , which consists of multiple branch lines connected to SCXF tracks. In 2021, the SCXF began operating the Sugar Express , a heritage tourist passenger train featuring a steam locomotive pulling historic passenger cars.

Operation

The South Central Florida Express (SCXF) is at its busiest during the main sugar harvest, which usually runs from October to March each year. U.S. Sugar is the only sugar company in the continental U.S. that transports sugarcane by rail.

In addition to the SCXF, U.S. Sugar has its own private tracks known as the U.S. Sugar Railroad, which is made up of several branch lines running from SCXF tracks to sugar fields near Clewiston and Bryant. Unlike the SCXF, the USSC is not a common carrier and is not subject to Federal Railroad Administration regulations.

Sugarcane harvested from fields along the line on the west and south sides of Lake Okeechobee is taken by rail in specially designed rail cars to U.S. Sugar's refinery in Clewiston for processing. The SCXF refers to these trains as "cane trains", which then take empty cars back out to the fields.

On the east side of the lake, sugarcane is collected the same way and loaded cars are brought to Bryant Yard near Pahokee, where cars are combined on to longer trains before being sent to Clewiston. This movement of trains from Bryant to Clewiston is referred to as the Bryant Turn. Since the junction switch at the entrance to Bryant Yard is oriented north on the main line, Bryant Turn trains are backed out of the yard on to the main line before heading south and west to Clewiston. During harvest season, Bryant Turn trains can run as often as every four hours.

Refined by-products such as sugar crystals and molasses are shipped from the refinery by rail to interchanges on each end of the line, where they are sent throughout the United States. Chemicals for refining sugar are also brought in to the refinery from the interchanges. SCXF's western terminus interchanges with CSX on their Auburndale Subdivision in Sebring, and the eastern terminus in Fort Pierce interchanges with the Florida East Coast Railway (FEC) in Fort Pierce. The SCXF also has haulage rights with the FEC to Jacksonville to further interchange with CSX and Norfolk Southern.

Fleet
The South Central Florida Express operates 12 EMD GP locomotives and about 800 specifically designed rail cars for transporting raw sugarcane. Nearly all locomotives on both SCXF and USSC tracks carry the USSC reporting mark.

Route

The main line is divided into east and west sides, and the Miami Canal on the south side of Lake Okeechobee in Lake Harbor is where the two sides officially connect. The milepost numbers on each side are independent from one another and remain as they did under predecessor companies.

West side

The  of main-line track on the west side of Lake Okeechobee begins in Sebring at a connection with CSX's Auburndale Subdivision just south of Sebring's Amtrak station. A short distance south from Sebring is Desoto City Yard, a small three-track switching yard. CSX has trackage rights into Desoto City Yard where interchange between the two companies takes place.

From Desoto City, the line continues south running mostly parallel to US 27 through Lake Placid and Palmdale. Just south of Palmdale, at a point historically known as Harrisburg, the line turns southeast towards Moore Haven. The line crosses the Caloosahatchee Canal on a small swing bridge in Moore Haven.

The line continues southeast from Moore Haven winding through sugar fields before reaching Clewiston. Clewiston is the location of U.S. Sugar's refinery which is co-located with SCXF's Clewiston Yard. The yard and refinery are located off the main line on a wye known as Sugar Junction. SCXF's maintenance facility is also located in Clewiston along W.C. Owen Avenue.

South of Clewiston, the line winds south and east through more sugar fields before coming to a point known as Keela. At Keela, the line splits with a  branch line heading south and east to Okeelanta while the main line heads east from Keela to Lake Harbor, where it crosses the Miami Canal and connects with the east side.

West side history
The northernmost  of the west side between Sebring and Harrisburg was built in 1916 by the Atlantic Coast Line Railroad as part of an effort to extend their Haines City Branch south to Immokalee. Harrisburg was named after the Harris track-laying machine used to construct the line. Trackage south of Harrisburg to Immokalee, which went as far south as Everglades City at one time, was abandoned in 1989.

The Atlantic Coast Line built tracks from Harrisburg to Moore Haven in 1918. In 1921, the Moore Haven & Clewiston Railway was built, which extended the Coast Line's tracks to Clewiston. The Coast Line leased the Moore Haven & Clewiston Railway in 1925, and extended it to Lake Harbor in 1929. Even in its early days, the line mostly served U.S. Sugar (and its predecessor, the Southern Sugar Company prior to 1931), who built and operated their own small branch near Clewiston and Lake Okeechobee that connected to the Coast Line (the USSC tracks). By 1944, the Atlantic Coast Line completely bought out the Moore Haven & Clewiston Railway.

Through mergers, the Atlantic Coast Line network would become part of CSX by 1986. CSX operated the line as their Sebring Subdivision along the main line to the sugar fields and Okeelanta Subdivision on the branch line to Okeelanta.

The west side was bought from CSX on June 2, 1990, by the Brandywine Valley Railroad, a Lukens Steel Company subsidiary, and sold to U.S. Sugar on September 17, 1994.

East side

The  of main-line track on the east side of Lake Okeechobee continues the line from Lake Harbor east to South Bay and then north to Belle Glade, Pahokee, and Canal Point.

Located just off the main line on a spur between Pahokee and Canal Point is Bryant Yard. Bryant Yard is used to sort cars and consolidate trains from a number of nearby fields before being sent to Clewiston. Bryant Yard was co-located with the now defunct Bryant Sugar Mill, which closed in 2017.

The line crosses the St. Lucie Canal on a small lift bridge in Port Mayaca. The line then continues to follow the lake a short distance before turning northwest to a point known as Marcy. The line crosses CSX's Auburndale Subdivision at Marcy before continuing northeast directly to Fort Pierce, where it connects to the FEC.

East side history
When the FEC ran the east side, it referred to the line as their K Branch. It was the southernmost segment of the FEC's Kissimmee Valley Line to Lake Okeechobee, which originally branched off the FEC main line near New Smyrna Beach and ran south through the Kissimmee Valley. It reached Belle Glade by 1923, and was extended to the Miami Canal in Lake Harbor in 1929 to connect with the Atlantic Coast Line. Most of the Kissimmee Valley Line north of Marcy was abandoned in 1947, and the remaining track was connected to the FEC main line by way of a new track from Fort Pierce known as the Glades Cutoff. The SCXF began leasing the east side line from the FEC on March 2, 1998, and now fully operates the line from milepost K 15 (Cana) south, and has trackage rights into FEC's Fort Pierce Yard where the interchange takes place.

Sugar Express

In late 2016, U.S. Sugar reacquired USSC No. 148, a 4-6-2 steam locomotive that they previously owned from 1952 to the 1970s. U.S. Sugar originally bought it from the FEC, which ran the locomotive on its Key West Extension. After being reacquired from the Denver and Rio Grande Historical Foundation in Monte Vista, Colorado and a three-year restoration work performed by the FMW Solutions, the No. 148 locomotive now runs on recycled vegetable oil and began its first revenue service, pulling the last cane train of the 2019–2020 harvest season on May 28, 2020.

The South Central Florida Express now runs the No. 148 locomotive as part of USSC's heritage tourist passenger train named the Sugar Express. During the summer months of 2021, U.S. Sugar acquired an ex-Wabash turntable from St. Louis, Missouri, which will eventually be used to turn the No. 148 locomotive around at Clewiston. In need of rolling stocks for the Sugar Express, U.S. Sugar leased the Georgia 300 observation car. They acquired an ex-Pennsylvania Railroad lounge car renamed from William Penn to Palmdale, along with an ex-Santa Fe and Amtrak baggage car converted into an open-air car and named the Miami Locks. Additionally, USSC acquired three ex-Great Northern Railway passenger cars from the United Railroad Historical Society of New Jersey and repainted them in an Illinois Central City of Miami homage livery.  U.S. Sugar also purchased a second 4-6-2 steam locomotive, Atlantic Coast Line 1504 from the North Florida Chapter of the National Railway Historical Society in Jacksonville, Florida, which will become part of the Sugar Express after it is restored to operating condition. 

On December 12, 2021, the Sugar Express ran its first public excursion, featuring the No. 148 locomotive pulling the Lake Placid Limited train from Clewiston to Lake Placid and back. On January 29-30, 2022, U.S. Sugar and Trains Magazine hosted a private photo charter of the No. 148 locomotive pulling passenger and freight consists. On April 23-25, the No. 148 locomotive participated in taking the American Association of Private Railroad Car Owners' (AAPRCO) special Sugarland Limited train on a multi-day tour around the Lake Okeechobee counties. Sugar Express has announced a full season of events during late 2022 and early 2023, including special holiday train events for Lake Placid and Clewiston, Florida, as well as short trips and all-day excursions in and around the Lake Okeechobee region.

See also
List of United States railroads
List of Florida railroads

References

Further reading

External links

The official page
Sugar Express
Railway Age 1999 Short Line/Regional Railroad of the Year Awards

1994 establishments in Florida
Florida railroads
Heritage railroads in Florida